Roland de Neve (born 19 February 1944) is a former Belgian cyclist. He competed in the team time trial and the team pursuit events at the 1964 Summer Olympics.

References

1944 births
Living people
Belgian male cyclists
Olympic cyclists of Belgium
Cyclists at the 1964 Summer Olympics
Sportspeople from Ghent
Cyclists from East Flanders